Desulfovibrio alkalitolerans  is an alkalitolerant and sulphate-reducing bacterium from the genus of Desulfovibrio which has been isolated from a district heating plant in Skanderborg in Denmark.

References

Further reading

External links
Type strain of Desulfovibrio alkalitolerans at BacDive -  the Bacterial Diversity Metadatabase	

Bacteria described in 2006
Desulfovibrio